Qareh Cheshmeh (or Romanized as Qarah Chashmeh) is a settlement in Sangar Rural District, inside the Central District of Faruj County, North Khorasan Province, Iran. At the 2006 census, its population was 571, in 115 families.

References 

Populated places in Faruj County